Teresin is a village in Sochaczew County, Masovian Voivodeship, in east-central Poland. It is the seat of the gmina (administrative district) called Gmina Teresin.

The village has a population of 2,500.

References

Teresin